Parliamentary elections were held in Turkmenistan on 25 March 2018, alongside local elections.

Electoral system
The 125 members of the Assembly were elected in single-member constituencies by first-past-the-post voting. A turnout of at least 50% of registered voters is required to validate the result in a constituency, forcing a repeat of the election in it if not attained.

Campaign
A total of 284 candidates contested the elections; 117 from the Democratic Party, 28 from the Agrarian Party, 23 from the Party of Industrialists and Entrepreneurs and 116 as independents.

Conduct 
The 2018 OSCE election observer mission noted,The 25 March elections lacked important prerequisites of a genuinely democratic electoral process. The political environment is only nominally pluralist and does not offer voters political alternatives. Exercise of fundamental freedoms is severely curtailed, inhibiting free expression of the voters’ will. Despite measures to demonstrate transparency, the integrity of elections was not ensured, leaving veracity of results in doubt.

Results

References

Elections in Turkmenistan
Turkmenistan
2018 in Turkmenistan
Election and referendum articles with incomplete results